Down Under is an Australian black comedy drama film set in the aftermath of the 2005 Cronulla riots. It is written and directed by Abe Forsythe.

Cast
 Damon Herriman as Jason
 Lincoln Younes as Hassim
 Alexander England as Shit-Stick
 David Field as Vic
 Marshall Napier as Graham
 Rahel Romahn as Nick
 Michael Denkha as Ibrahim
 Chris Bunton as Evan 
 Fayssal Bazzi as D-Mac
 Justin Rosniak as Ditch
 Harriet Dyer as Stacey
 Josh McConville as Gav
 Dylan Young as Az
 Christiaan Van Vuuren as Doof
 Anthony Taufa as Taufa
 Robert Rabiah as Amir
 John Ibrahim as Middle-Eastern Man in Gucci Hat

Reception
On review aggregator Rotten Tomatoes, the film holds an approval rating of 63% based on 19 reviews, with an average rating of 6.6/10.

Accolades

References

External links
 
 Down Under at Rotten Tomatoes

2016 films
2010s English-language films
2016 comedy-drama films
Australian comedy-drama films
Films set in Australia
Films shot in Sydney